Argyrosomus hololepidotus, also known as the Madagascar meagre or southern meagre, is a species of fish in the family Sciaenidae. The species is endemic to Madagascar and the Indian Ocean.

The meagre is found in underwater rifts, around river estuaries, off of beaches and around reefs. They can grow to a large size and weight, and a commercial fishery for the species exists. Meagres feed on small fish, shrimp, crabs, and cuttlefish.

References 

Fish described in 1801
Fish of Madagascar
Fish of the Indian Ocean
Sciaenidae